Helga's Web was a 1970 novel by Australian author Jon Cleary, the second to feature his detective hero Scobie Malone.

Cleary did not originally intend to use the character again but wanted to write about the construction of the new Sydney Opera House and thought the detective could be a good way to access that.

Adaptation
The novel was adapted into a film as Scobie Malone (1975).

References

External links
Helga's Web at AustLit (subscription required)

1970 Australian novels
Novels set in Sydney
William Collins, Sons books
William Morrow and Company books
Novels by Jon Cleary